Stan (foaled in 1950 in England) was a Thoroughbred racehorse who raced in England and in the United States where he was the 1954 American Champion Male Turf Horse. Racing at age two in 1952, he won six of his eight starts in England before being sold to an American buyer who in turn subsequently sold him to for US$29,050 Allie Reuben, owner of Hasty House Farm.

References

 Stan's pedigree and partial racing stats

1950 racehorse births
Thoroughbred family 3-j
Racehorses bred in the United Kingdom
Racehorses trained in the United Kingdom
Racehorses trained in the United States
American Champion racehorses